Sunderdas (1596–1689) was a noted saint, poet, philosopher and social reformer of medieval India. He was a disciple of Dadu Dayal. Sunderdas was born in 1596 in Dausa in Rajasthan state in India. Sant Sunderdas composed about 48 books. He is revered as the Sankaracharya of Hindi  literature, and is popularly known as Sant Kavi Sunderdas.

References

External links 
Sant Kavi Sunderdas biography at hinduyouth.com

17th-century Indian poets
Hindi-language poets
Rajasthani people
1689 deaths
1596 births
People from Dausa district
Indian social reformers
Indian male poets
Poets from Rajasthan
Activists from Rajasthan
17th-century male writers